Nationality words link to articles with information on the nation's poetry or literature (for instance, Irish or France).

Events

Works published

Great Britain
 William Davenant, Ieffereidos
 John Donne, A Help to Memory and Discourse, including The Broken Heart and part of "Song" ("Go and catch a falling star ...")
 Michael Drayton, The Muses Elizium
 Thomas May, A Continuation of Lucan's Historicall Poem Till the Death of Julius Caesar (see also Lucan's Pharsalia 1626, 1627)
 Diana Primrose, 
 Francis Quarles, Divine Poems
 Thomas Randolph, Aristippus; or, The Joviall Philosopher, published anonymously
 Nathanael Richards, The Celestiall Publican
 Alexander Ross, Three Decads of Divine Meditations
 John Taylor, All the Workes of John Taylor the Water-Poet

Other
 José Pellicer de Salas y Tovar, Complete Readings of the Works by Luis de Góngora y Argote, criticism; Spain

Births
Death years link to the corresponding "[year] in poetry" article:
 January 17 – Sultan Bahu (died 1691), Muslim Sufi saint and poet
 April 28 – Charles Cotton (died 1687),  English poet and writer
 Francisco Ayerra de Santa María (died 1708), Puerto Rico's first native born poet

Deaths
Birth years link to the corresponding "[year] in poetry" article:
 March – Thomas Bateson, also spelled "Batson" or "Betson" (born 1570), English-born writer of madrigals
 April 29 – Théodore-Agrippa d'Aubigné (born 1552), French poet, soldier, propagandist and chronicler
 November 19 – Johann Hermann Schein died (born 1586), German
 Also:
 Pedro Bucaneg (born 1592), blind Filipino poet, "Father of Ilokano literature"
 Gian Domenico Cancianini (born 1547), Italian, Latin-language poet
 Samuel Rowlands, died about this year (born c. 1570), English pamphleteer, poet and satirist
 Jacob Uziel (born unknown), Spanish physician and poet

See also

 Poetry
 16th century in poetry
 16th century in literature

Notes

17th-century poetry
Poetry